Demodokus may refer to:
 11429 Demodokus, a Jupiter-trojan asteroid
 Demodocus (Odyssey character) by Homer